The Visual Component Framework (VCF) is an abandoned open source project for development under Microsoft Windows and Apple Macintosh that is distributed under the BSD license. It is an advanced C++ application framework that makes it easier to produce GUI-based C++ applications. The framework is C++ design and has built in support for rapid application development. The framework is designed to be portable over multiple platforms and compilers.

The framework runs under Windows and Mac OS X, but as of April 6, 2006, the Mac port was incomplete, and a Linux port was still pending.

The project has made a large effort to support a variety of compilers and Integrated Development Environments (IDE), allowing the developer to work in whatever IDE/compiler they prefer. Compiler support on Windows covers Microsoft Visual C++ versions 6, 7, 7.1, and 8, along with the Borland C++ Compiler, the Intel C++ Compiler, and GCC. On Mac OS X GCC is supported using the Xcode IDE. A CodeWarrior port was completed, but stopped due to CodeWarrior dropping support for their x86 version of the compiler, and later for their PowerPC version as well.

License
The framework is licensed under the BSD license for any platform it runs on.

Design and Goals
The framework is designed with several goals in mind. One is the ability to be ported to other platforms beyond Windows, such as Mac OS X, BeOS, or possibly even embedded operating systems like Windows CE.

The next goal is to provide solid support for dynamic programming such as that found in languages like Borland's Object Pascal, Java, or Objective-C. This included RTTI or reflection like classes that allow the developer to query all sorts of information about a given class instance at runtime.

Another goal was to design the UI classes so that visual programming or rapid application development was possible, similar to what is found in Delphi. This includes support for property editors, component editors, persistence of the UI state to and from an external text file, and making use of the dynamic features to create class instances on the fly and get and set the instance's registered properties.

In addition to this, the last goal was to provide support for a large number of common programming tasks when developing an application, particularly for larger scale applications. This includes support for various kinds of IO (in memory, file/disk, and so forth), thread support and various synchronization primitives like mutexes, semaphores, and conditions, Unicode string support, locale and internationalization support including localizing string resources, comprehensive resource support, and basic XML parsing. Graphics features include anti-aliased graphics using the Anti-Grain Graphics Library, full affine transformation support, images with direct access to the image's pixel bits. Additional application support features also include undo/redo classes, advanced support for Model View Controller.

As a general rule, the framework makes as much use as possible of the Standard Template Library, avoiding duplication of work on things like container classes, or string handling.

Where possible the framework builds on top of the native C++ RTTI support such as using dynamic_cast and typeid, as opposed to simply re-implementing it.

Most OS objects, such as files, threads, graphics devices, and window controls (or widgets), and so on, are implemented using a thin layer that talks directly to the specific native object. UI controls are not emulated for the most part, instead the framework uses native widgets in most places. Direct access to the underlying OS "handle" is allowed in cases where platform specific functionality is needed, allowing the developer to easily call the platform's native APIs.

See also

 Software component
 Widget toolkit
 List of widget toolkits
 Qt
 wxWidgets
 Motif
 GTK+
 Gtkmm
 FLTK
 FOX toolkit
 Ultimate++

External links
 
 The VCF Reference Documentation
 The VCF Source Documentation
 The VCF Builder homepage
 Anti-Grain Graphics Library

Software using the BSD license
Widget toolkits